The Journal of Solid State Chemistry is a monthly peer-reviewed scientific journal published by Elsevier. The journal covers the chemical, structural, thermodynamic, electronic, and electromagnetic characteristics and properties of solids, including ceramics and amorphous materials. The editor-in-chief is M.G. Kanatzidis (Northwestern University).

Abstracting and indexing 
This journal is abstracted and indexed by:
 BioEngineering Abstracts
 Chemical Abstracts Service
 Coal Abstracts - International Energy Agency
 Current Contents/Physics, Chemical, & Earth Sciences
 Engineering Index
 Science Abstracts
 Science Citation Index
According to the Journal Citation Reports, the journal has a 2020 impact factor of 3.498.

See also 
 Solid-state chemistry

References

External links 

Elsevier academic journals
Materials science journals
Chemistry journals
Engineering journals
Publications established in 1969
Monthly journals